Edene Gebbie (born 6 May 1995) is a Papua New Guinean professional rugby league footballer who plays as a  and er for the PNG Hunters in the Hostplus Cup and Papua New Guinea at international level.

He previously played for the Townsville Blackhawks and Wynnum Manly Seagulls in the Hostplus Cup.

Background
Gebbie was born in Sogeri, Papua New Guinea.

Career
Gebbie made his international debut for Papua New Guinea in their 24-6 defeat by Samoa in the 2019 Oceania Cup.

2018 
In 2018, Gebbie was named rookie of the year for the Papua New Guinea Hunters. Gebbie finished with 10 tries from 15 games that season for the Hunters.

2019 
In July 2019 the South Sydney Rabbitohs announced they had signed Gebbie for the 2020 and 2021 seasons. "Edene is an exciting prospect and we're looking forward to seeing him develop his skills over the next two years under the guidance of our coaching staff", Rabbitohs' football manager Shane Richardson said, "He has scored 19 tries in 29 games over the past two seasons with his sides winning 22 of those 29 games in which he played."

In September, Gebbie recorded 2 line-breaks and 169 run metres in Wynnum-Manly Seagulls' grand final defeat by the Burleigh Bears. In 21 games that year the 24-year-old fullback scored 19 tries, recorded 21 line breaks and 162 tackle breaks. He also averaged 208 running metres.

2020 

Gebbie was released from the South Sydney Rabbitohs team due to covid 19 reducing squad numbers to 32 players and he had to return to Papua New Guinea where he joined local club, Lae Snax Tigers where he was not given game time.

2021 

Gebbie was named in the PNG Hunters 37-man train on squad to be based in Australia but had to withdraw.

In March 2021, it was announced that Gebbie was offered and accepted a Train and Trial contract with the Wests Tigers.

2022 

Edene Gebbie joined the Townsville Blackhawks for the 2022 season. Gebbie was named in the PNG Kumuls 2021 Rugby League world cup squad but had to withdraw due to a groin injury.

2023 

Gebbie has rejoined the PNG Hunters for the 2023 Hostplus cup season.

References

External links
Wynnum-Manly profile

1995 births
Living people
Papua New Guinean rugby league players
Papua New Guinea national rugby league team players
Papua New Guinea Hunters players
Townsville Blackhawks players
Rugby league fullbacks
Rugby league wingers
People from Central Province (Papua New Guinea)
Western Suburbs Magpies NSW Cup players
Wynnum Manly Seagulls players